The 2014–15 1. FC Köln season was the 66th season in club history.

Players

Current squad

For recent transfers, see List of German football transfers summer 2014.

Competitions

Bundesliga

League table

Results summary

Results by round

Matches

DFB-Pokal

References

Koln
1. FC Köln seasons